Ornopyramis is a genus of flies in the family Stratiomyidae.

Species
Ornopyramis tener Krivosheina, 1973

References

Stratiomyidae
Brachycera genera
Diptera of Asia